The Prix Gémeaux or Gémeaux Awards honour achievements in Canadian television and digital media that is broadcast in French. It has been sponsored by the Academy of Canadian Cinema and Television since 1987. Introduced as a French-language equivalent to the Gemini Awards, the Canadian Academy's former presentation for English-language television, it remains separate from the contemporary Canadian Screen Awards despite being presented by the same parent organization.

History

In 1986, ACTRA transferred their awards to the Academy of Canadian Cinema & Television. The Academy called their television awards the Gemini Awards, or Prix Gémeaux in French. After their first Gemini awards ceremony for English-language television, the academy decided to have an awards ceremony for French-language television in 1987. In 2003 the Academy added categories for digital media.

The first webcast for the awards ceremony was in 2008.

In 2013, the Academy decided to keep the Prix Gémeaux separate from the merged Canadian Screen Awards. The Academy decided on this separation because French-language television does not have strong viewership in English Canada and there is a strong recognition of French-speaking celebrities among Quebecois people.

In 2015, many categories were separated or renamed in response to production studios boycotting previous ceremonies. The Academy eliminated Best Soap Opera and replaced Best Drama Series with Best Annual Drama Series for shows that have between 2 and 13 episodes, Best Seasonal Drama Series for 14 to 26 episodes, and Best Daily Drama Show. In 2018 a change in rules dictated that if there is only one show nominated in a category, that show can instead be entered into the category that is closest to its runtime. This rule allowed District 31 to apply for entry in the Best Seasonal Drama Series.

Nomination process

Before 2015, production companies and producers would submit shows and individuals to be considered for a nomination. The Academy then created a nomination jury of five or six people who were selected because they had expertise and experience in that category. After viewing all entries, the jury would meet to choose by consensus two to five people to be nominated. The nominees would be announced in June. After a rules change in 2015, the juries for each category were replaced with six juries whose membership was decided by broadcasters.

Awards process

Before 2015, the process of awarding Prix Gémeaux consisted of a weighted vote; 50% of the weighted vote was from the nomination jury while 50% was weighted from members of the Academy. Each voter would rank the nominees from best to worst. After 2015, the weighted vote was recalculated and the nomination juries were 70% of the weighted total while 20% was decided by Academy members. The remaining 10% was based on the show's ratings and each program was ranked by Numeris.

Awards

For awards of merit, there are 84 television categories and 15 digital media categories. The Academy also awards Special Awards for various achievements. The Academy appoints a special committee who suggests nominations but they have also sent calls for nominations from Academy members. A proposed nominee is then presented to the Quebec board of the Academy for approval. The special awards include "le Gémeau spécial des artisans" created in 2019 and "le prix spécial de la relève" is awarded to someone at the beginning of their career who is under 35 years old.

In 2022, the Prix Gémeaux announced that they would move to presenting ungendered categories for Best Performance, in lieu of separate categories for actors and actresses. This followed a similar announcement by the Canadian Screen Awards earlier in 2022.

Notes

References

External links
 Official site of the Academy of Canadian Cinema and Television (English and French sections)

Canadian television awards
French-language television in Canada
Recurring events established in 1987
Academy of Canadian Cinema & Television
1987 establishments in Canada